The Acid are an electronic music quartet consisting of British DJ and record producer Adam Freeland; Californian producer, composer and professor of music technology Steve Nalepa; American singer/songwriter Jens Kuross; and Los Angeles-based Australian artist RY X. RY X is also one half of Howling with Frank Wiedemann.

On April 14, 2013, the group released their debut self-titled EP, along with a video for the track "Basic Instinct". On July 7, 2014, they released their debut album Liminal on Infectious Music (UK) and Mute Records (US).

In 2017, the band released their soundtrack to the critically acclaimed film the bomb on 12" vinyl.

In 2018, several songs from the album Liminal, including "Tumbling Lights" and "Ghost," were featured on the HBO series Sharp Objects.

References

External links
Official website

Electronic music groups
Minimalist composers
Musical groups established in 2013
Mute Records artists
Musical trios
Infectious Music artists